is a Japanese politician of the Liberal Democratic Party, a member of the House of Representatives in the Diet (national legislature). A native of Hiroshima, Hiroshima and graduate of the University of Tokyo, he worked at the Ministry of Finance from 1969 to 1995. He was elected to the House of Representatives for the first time in 2000 as a member of the New Frontier Party. Later, he became an independent and then joined the LDP.

References

External links 
  

Members of the House of Representatives (Japan)
University of Tokyo alumni
People from Hiroshima
Living people
1945 births
New Frontier Party (Japan) politicians
20th-century Japanese politicians
Liberal Democratic Party (Japan) politicians
21st-century Japanese politicians